Mareen "Peanut" Louie-Harper (born August 15, 1960) is a retired American tennis player, born in San Francisco, California to Ron and Alice Louie. She was a top-ranked junior tennis player and professional tennis player on the WTA tour. She reached a career high singles ranking of 19 in the world in 1985 and doubles ranking of 31 in the world in 1992. She is currently the co-founder and program director of Harper for Kids, a youth character development program.

Professional tennis career 
During her career, she won 14 USTA National Junior titles and was the #1 ranked 16-and-under (1976) and 12-and-under tennis player (1972) in the United States. Peanut was the Junior Wimbledon finalist in 1977 and a semifinalist in 1978. She was also the #1 ranked junior in NorCal in all age divisions (10, 12, 14, 16 & 18 & unders).

After a successful junior career, she turned pro in 1978. In her 16-year career, she won four singles titles and reached a career high ranking of No. 19 in the world (in 1985). She also won five doubles titles and reached a career high ranking of No. 31 in the world (in 1992). At the Grand Slams, her best results were reaching the round of 32 in singles and the round of 16 in doubles several times. Among her best wins were victories over Gabriela Sabatini, Zina Garrison, Mary Joe Fernandez, Helena Sukova, Wendy Turnbull, Stephanie Rehe and Andrea Jaeger.

Louie was honored with the WTA Karen Krantzcke Sportsmanship Award in back-to-back years in 1985 and 1986 from the Women's Tennis Association (WTA). In 1986, she was also named Tennis magazine's Comeback Player of the Year. During her junior career, she was presented with the USTA Girls’ 18 National Championship Sportsmanship Award in 1977.

Personal life and post-tennis career 
Her older sister Marcie also played on the WTA Tour, and her sisters Cici and Marisa, and brother Ronnie, all played at the University of San Francisco. She, along with her siblings, trained on the tennis courts of Golden Gate Park. She was given the nickname Peanut by her father because she was the youngest of the five children.

She was inducted into the USTA Northern California Hall of Fame in 2000, the Multi-Ethnic Sports of Fame in 2017, the San Francisco Prep Hall of Fame in 2010, and the George Washington Athletic Hall of Fame in 1991.

She married her husband Tim Harper in 1986. They live in San Francisco and have two kids, Casey and Jared. Jared, who is a singer-songwriter, auditioned on Season 18 of The Voice

Charity work 
In 2008, she co-founded Harper for Kids (HFK), a children's nonprofit organization, with her husband Tim Harper. HFK's youth character development program is based on John Wooden's Pyramid of Success and teaches youth essential character traits that can help them achieve their personal best in life. HFK helps schools incorporate the Pyramid of Success into their character education. Before starting Harper for Kids, Peanut collaborated with John Wooden on his children's book Inch and Miles: The Journey to Success (Perfection Learning), with co-author Steve Jamison.

Hall of Fame inductions 
 Multi-Ethnic Sports Hall of Fame, 2017
 San Francisco Prep Hall of Fame, 2010
 USTA NorCal Hall of Fame, 2000
 George Washington High School Athletic Hall of Fame, 1991

Awards and honors 
 The Chinese Historical Society of America, 1986 recipient
 Tennis magazine's Comeback Player of the Year, 1986 recipient
 WTA Karen Krantzcke Sportsmanship Award, 1985 ad 1986
 USTA Girls’ 18 National Championship Sportsmanship Award
 OCA (Organization of Chinese Americans) East Bay Chapter
 Queen of Hearts Foundation, 2011 Honorary Chairperson
 OCA (Organization of Chinese Americans) San Mateo Chapter

WTA career finals

Singles (4 titles, 1 runner-up)

Doubles (5 titles, 5 runner-ups)

References

External links
Harper For Kids website
 
 

1960 births
Living people
American female tennis players
Tennis players from San Francisco
San Francisco Dons women's tennis players
American sportspeople of Chinese descent